State Road 5A (SR 5A), also known as Nova Road, is a north–south highway that begins and ends at U.S. Highway 1 or US 1 (unsigned SR 5), in Port Orange and Ormond Beach, respectively. It is noted that when 5A was built, it was used more as a bypass or beltway, but in recent years with growth reaching far beyond SR 5A, it sees more use as a major thoroughfare that passes through the heart of the region.

History

Previous designations

There have been several former SR 5A in existence:

Flagler Avenue from First Street to South Roosevelt Drive (State Road A1A) in Key West - now County Road 5A
Krome Avenue (now State Road 997) in Florida City and North Flagler Avenue (formerly U.S. Highway 1 Business) in Homestead - the BUS US 1 designation was removed in 1969.
Portions of West Dixie Highway and Old Federal Highway from State Road 826 in North Miami Beach to US 1 in Dania Beach - designation removed in the late 1990s, although it is still recognized on the FDOT's official map of Broward County as County Road 5A. The Florida East Coast Railroad Main Line runs between the road from the Miami-Dade-Broward County Line to the vicinity of Southwest 13th Street in Dania Beach.
State Road 5A was also a short connector between Federal Highway (US 1) and the former State Road A1A (Southeast Dixie Highway, now County Road A1A) in Stuart.  The connector is now County Road 5A.
State Road 5A(Old Dixie Highway) was another connector between Gifford and Wabasso, that ran along the FEC Main Line, that is now County Road 5A.

County Road 5A

County Road 5A (also known as Stuckway Road) is a  spur route of State Road 5 (U.S. Route 1.) It is the northernmost Brevard County route, and also the shortest. From Interstate 95, it provides access to Oak Hill and Scottsmoor, the northernmost town in Brevard. However, at its eastern terminus, it isn't in the town limits of Scottsmoor. Geographically, it is bounded by Volusia County to the north, and Aurantia to the south. The western terminus is with an intersection with Interstate 95, although Stuckway Road continues west as a dirt road. The eastern terminus is with an intersection with U.S. Route 1/State Road 5 near Scottsmoor.

Major intersections

See also

References

External links

005A
005A
005A
Former State Roads in Miami-Dade County, Florida
Former State Roads in Broward County, Florida
Former State Roads in Indian River County, Florida